Jebel Akhdar or Djebel Akhdar  (English: The Green Mountain) may be:

Jebel Akhdar (Libya), wooded highland area 
 Jabal al Akhdar, a district in Libya
Jebel Akhdar (Oman)
 Jebel Akhdar War, 1954-1959